Energy Plaza is a skyscraper in the City Center District of downtown Dallas, Texas, United States, north of Thanks-Giving Square at 1601 Bryan Street.

The building itself is based on a design using three triangles. The communications tower at the top of the building is a small version of the Star Tower broadcast tower line from Landmark Tower Company, which went bankrupt after its owner and chief design engineer died from a heart attack in 2002.

Construction on the building began in May 1980 and the building opened in August 1983 for the Atlantic Richfield Company to be used as their regional headquarters. The structure's original name was the ARCO Tower. Energy Future Holdings, Oncor Electric Delivery, and FuelcoLLC.com, are the primary tenants. Other notable tenants include Civitas Capital Management LLC. The building is connected to the Dallas Pedestrian Network and the Bullington Truck Terminal.

See also

List of tallest buildings in Dallas

References

External links
 Dallas Skyscrapers: Energy Plaza 

ARCO
BP buildings and structures
Downtown Dallas
I. M. Pei buildings
Office buildings completed in 1983
Skyscraper office buildings in Dallas